Polaris is a  science fiction mystery novel by American writer Jack McDevitt. It is the second book of his Alex Benedict series. Antiquities dealer Alex Benedict and his employee, Chase Kolpath, become involved in a mystery involving the disappearance of the passengers and crew of an interstellar yacht from 60 years earlier.

It was nominated for the Nebula Award for Best Novel.

References

2004 American novels
2004 science fiction novels
American science fiction novels
Novels by Jack McDevitt
Ace Books books